Tom Panhuyzen (born 19 April 1965) is a Canadian former international soccer player who played as a defender.

Career
Born in Toronto, Panhuyzen played club soccer for the Ottawa Pioneers, Ottawa Intrepid, Hamilton Steelers and Toronto Blizzard.
He earned 5 caps for the Canadian national team between 1987 and 1988.

References

1965 births
Living people
Soccer players from Toronto
Canadian soccer players
Canada men's international soccer players
Ottawa Intrepid players
Hamilton Steelers (1981–1992) players
Toronto Blizzard (1986–1993) players
Canadian Soccer League (1987–1992) players
Association football defenders